Twice as Nice is a 1989 drama film directed by Jessie Maple and starring Pamela McGee, Paula McGee, and Cynthia Cooper-Dyke. It was Maple's second feature, making her the first African-American woman to direct two feature films.

Premise
The film follows twins Caren and Camilla Parker (played by real-life twins Pamela and Paula McGee), two young college basketball stars at Columbia University, as they navigate talent, competition, and relationships while vying for the first female MBA pick.

Cast
 Pamela McGee and Paula McGee as Caren and Camilla Parker
 Cynthia Cooper-Dyke as Damita Jean Johnson
 Stephanie Lynn Wilson as Loretta

Themes
This film shed light on women basketball players and was released years before the WNBA was created. The plot examines sisterhood, success, and competition, while the camera captures mundane moments and transform them into an  intimate and humanist study on family.

Production
This was Maple's second feature film, released eight years after her debut Will. Maple hired non-professional actors, such as WNBA player and coach Cynthia Cooper-Dyke.

Poet and actress S. Pearl Sharp wrote the screenplay.

Restoration
In 2015, Twice as Nice was one of 57 films saved by a grant from the National Film Preservation Foundation. The restoration was made possible when the Academy Film Archive uncovered the original picture and track elements at the DuArt Film Lab. The final restoration will be "a 16mm preservation element, a 16mm release print, and a digital master of the film".

Screenings
 Tell It Like It Is: Black Independents in New York, 1968 – 1986, Film Society Lincoln Center, 2015
 One Way Or Another, Black Women's Cinema, 1970–1991, Brooklyn Academy of Music, 2017

References

African-American drama films
1989 drama films
1989 films
American independent films
1989 independent films
Films shot in 16 mm film
1980s English-language films
1980s American films